The 2003 Wokingham District Council election took place on 1 May 2003 to elect members of Wokingham Unitary Council in Berkshire, England. One third of the council was up for election and the Conservative Party stayed in overall control of the council.

After the election, the composition of the council was:
Conservative 33
Liberal Democrat 20
Labour 1

Election result
18 seats were contested with the Liberal Democrats defending 10, the Conservatives 7, while 1 seat was held by an independent. The results saw this situation turned round with the Conservatives winning 10 seats as compared to 8 for the Liberal Democrats. The Conservatives gained seats from the Liberal Democrats in Emmbrook and Little Hungerford wards, while also recovering Sonning which had been held by an independent who had defected from the Conservatives. There was controversy over the result in Whitegates when the Returning Officer initially read the results out as a Conservative gain, while the actual vote count was a Liberal Democrat hold. Overall turnout in the election was 30.4%.

The Conservatives described the results as an endorsement of their record, while the Liberal Democrats called them disappointing but were pleased that their vote share had increased from 2002.

Ward results

References

2003 English local elections
2003
2000s in Berkshire